was a town located in Hikawa District, Shimane Prefecture, Japan.

As of 2003, the town had an estimated population of 5,843 and a density of 262.49 persons per km2. The total area was 22.26 km2.

On March 22, 2005, Koryō, along with the city of Hirata, the towns of Sada, Taisha and Taki (all from Hikawa District), was merged into the expanded city of Izumo.

Dissolved municipalities of Shimane Prefecture